Boyue Cave is a karstic cave in Lengshuijiang, Hunan, China. Located at the foot of Mount dacheng, it was one of the locations of 1986 shenmo television series Journey to the West. It is now a popular destination for cavers, walkers, and outdoor activity groups.

History
In the 1980s, Boyue Cave served as a shooting location for the 1986 shenmo television series Journey to the West. The fight scenes in the Cavern of White Bone Demon were filmed in Boyue Cave. And the Seat of the Monkey King in Water Curtain Cave was shot in there.

Gallery

References

External links

 

Lengshuijiang
Limestone caves
Tourist attractions in Hunan